Morris Michtom (1870 – July 21, 1938) was a Russian-born businessman and inventor who, with his wife Rose, also a Russian Jewish immigrant who lived in Brooklyn, came up with the idea for the teddy bear in 1902 around the same time as Richard Steiff in Germany. They founded the Ideal Novelty and Toy Company which, after Michtom's death, became the largest doll-making company in the United States.

Biography
Michtom was born into a Jewish family and immigrated to New York in 1887. He sold candy in his shop at 404 Tompkins Avenue in Bedford-Stuyvesant Brooklyn by day and made stuffed animals with his wife Rose at night.

The teddy bear was inspired by a cartoon by Pulitzer Prize-winning cartoonist Clifford K. Berryman depicting American president Theodore Roosevelt—commonly called "Teddy"—having compassion for a bear at the end of an unsuccessful hunting trip in Mississippi in 1902. Michtom saw the drawing and created a tiny plush bear cub which he sent to Roosevelt. Michtom put a plush bear in the shop window with a sign "Teddy's bear." After the creation of the bear in 1902, the sale of the bears was so brisk that in 1907 Michtom created the Ideal Novelty and Toy Company.

Michtom died on the July 21, 1938 at the age of 68.

See also 
 Margarete Steiff

References

1870 births
1938 deaths
20th-century American inventors
Toy inventors
American Jews